Kim Sung-nam (born on July 19, 1954) is a former South Korea football player.

He was a former Yukong Elephants and Daewoo Royals.
He also has famous brother footballers. His elder brothers are Kim Jung-Nam and Kim Kang-Nam.

He was appointed Chief Scouter of FC Seoul in 2005 and appointed FC Seoul reserve team manager in 2005.

References

External links
 

Jeju United FC players
Busan IPark players
K League 1 players
FC Seoul non-playing staff
1954 births
Living people

Association football midfielders
South Korean footballers
South Korea international footballers